Leo von Zumbusch (28 June 1874, in Vienna – 30 March 1940, in Rimsting) was an Austrian-German dermatologist. He was the son of sculptor Kaspar von Zumbusch (1830–1915).

He studied medicine in Vienna, where he later worked as an assistant to dermatologists Moritz Kaposi and Gustav Riehl. In 1906 he obtained his habilitation for dermatology and syphilology, and in 1912 became an associate professor.

In 1909 he was named head of the Rudolfspital in Vienna, and four years later relocated to the University of Munich. In 1915 he was appointed director of the department of syphilis and dermatology. In 1932/33 he served as university rector. In 1935 he was forced by the Nazi government to relinquish his position at the university for political reasons.

In 1910 he described a rare form of generalized pustular psoriasis that is now referred to as Zumbusch psoriasis.

Selected works 
 Therapie der Hautkrankheiten : für Ärzte und Studierende, 1908 – Therapy of skin diseases for physicians and students.
 Atlas der Syphilis, translated into English in 1922 as "Atlas of syphilis".
 Atlas der Hautkrankheiten (with Gustav Riehl), translated into English in 1925 as "Atlas of diseases of the skin".

References 

1874 births
1940 deaths
Scientists from Vienna
University of Vienna alumni
Academic staff of the University of Vienna
Academic staff of the Ludwig Maximilian University of Munich
German dermatologists
Austrian dermatologists
Austro-Hungarian emigrants to Germany